The Edwardsville Intelligencer is an American daily newspaper in Illinois based in Edwardsville.  The paper is circulated in Edwardsville, Glen Carbon, and nearby rural areas.

The newspaper was founded in 1862. In 1960, longtime owner and publisher Gilbert Giese sold it to the owner of the Holyoke Transcript-Telegram. In 1964, the newspaper was purchased by Decatur, Illinois-based Lindsay-Schaub Newspapers. It was acquired by the Hearst Corporation in 1979.

References

External links 

 
Official mobile website

Newspapers published in Illinois
Hearst Communications publications
Edwardsville, Illinois
Companies based in Madison County, Illinois
Publications established in 1862
1862 establishments in Illinois